James Sprunt Community College is a public community college in Kenansville, North Carolina. Founded in 1960 as James Sprunt Technical Institute, the college is named for James Menzies Sprunt (1818-1884), a Scottish immigrant who became a teacher, Presbyterian minister, and the longtime pastor of Grove Presbyterian Church in Kenansville. James Sprunt Institute, active from 1897 to 1923, was also named for him. It is part of the North Carolina Community College System.

The college's athletic program is known as the Spartans.

References

External links
Official website

Two-year colleges in the United States
North Carolina Community College System colleges
Universities and colleges accredited by the Southern Association of Colleges and Schools
Education in Duplin County, North Carolina
Buildings and structures in Duplin County, North Carolina